Ammonium ozonide is an oxygen rich molecule containing an ammonium cation (NH4+) and an ozonide anion (O3−). Ammonium ozonide, like alkali ozonides, is a red solid. Ammonium ozonide is stable at low temperatures, but it decomposes to ammonium nitrate at temperatures above -70 °C.

Preparation and decomposition 
Ammonium ozonide is made by bubbling gaseous ozone through liquid ammonia at -110 °C. This method suffers from a low yield.

Ammonium ozonide decomposes into ammonium nitrate, oxygen gas, and water. If the above reaction is done at high temperatures, these decomposition products result immediately and no ozonide is formed.

References 

Ozonides
Ammonium compounds